Duschnik may refer to:

 Dušníky (Duschnik in German)
 Trhové Dušníky (Deutsch Duschnik in German)